Marmittone is an Italian comic strip series created by  Bruno Angoletta.

Background 
Started in 1928, Marmittone ("rooky") is derived from the "marmitta", the huge pot in which the military rations are cooked. The main character is a simple-minded soldier and of good will who, for his gaffes or simply for misfortune, goes to prison at the end of any adventure. The comic strip was published by Il Corriere dei Piccoli until 1940, a few weeks before the outbreak of World War II.

Marmittone is considered a parody of Fascist values of militarism and virility and was referred as "the most coherent and irreducible underhand antagonist of the soldierly stereotypes of any dictatorship".

References 

Italian comic strips
Italian comics characters
1928 comics debuts
1940 comics endings
Gag-a-day comics
Text comics
Fictional soldiers
Fictional Italian people
Military humor
Military comics
Comics characters introduced in 1928